Nola paromoea is a moth of the family Nolidae. It is found in Queensland, Australia.

The wingspan is about 15 mm.

References

External links 
 Markku Savela's Lepidoptera pages
 Australian Moths

paromoea
Endemic fauna of Australia
Moths of Queensland
Moths described in 1886